Inside the Lines may refer to:

 Inside the Lines (1930 film), an American pre-Code spy drama film
 Inside the Lines (1918 film), an American silent thriller film
 Inside the Lines, a 2016 song by Swedish DJ Mike Perry